Eren Kinali (born 24 February 2000) is an English professional footballer who plays as a midfielder for Etimesgut Belediyespor.

Career

Youth and Southend United

Born in Hackney, Kinali played youth football for Interwood, before joining the academy of Southend United after impressing Southend after scoring a hat-trick in a trial match against them at under-15 level. In April 2016, Kinali was offered a scholarship at Southend United. 

He joined Southern League Premier Division Central side Royston Town on loan in February 2019 and made his debut for the club in a 3–0 win against Banbury United the following day. He made 12 appearances for Royston, scoring four goals.

Kinali made his debut for Southend on 3 December 2019, coming on as a 76th-minute substitute for Brandon Goodship in a 1–1 draw away at Burton Albion. After six appearances for Southend United across the 2019–20 season, his contract was extended by one year in May 2020.

On 27 November 2021, he joined Southern League Premier Division South side Hendon on a one-month loan deal, going straight into the squad to face Walton Casuals.

In May 2022, Kinali was released by Southend United. On 24 July 2022, he joined TFF Second League side Etimesgut Belediyespor on a one-year deal with the option of a second.

Personal life
Kinali is of Turkish descent, with family from the city of Kahramanmaraş.

Career statistics

References

External links

2000 births
Living people
English footballers
Footballers from Hackney, London
Association football midfielders
Southend United F.C. players
Royston Town F.C. players
Brightlingsea Regent F.C. players
Hendon F.C. players
English Football League players
Southern Football League players
English people of Turkish descent
English expatriate footballers
English expatriate sportspeople in Turkey